Sarah Catherine Hendrickson (born August 1, 1994) is an American retired ski jumper. She won the inaugural women's World Cup season in 2012, finished runner-up in 2013, and won an individual gold medal at the 2013 World Championships.

Career 

Hendrickson was born in Salt Lake City, Utah. She attended Park City High School until 2011, when she began competing in the Ski Jumping World Cup. During this she moved to The Winter Sports School in Park City, where she graduated in November 2012.

In the first ever women's World Cup season in 2011/12, Hendrickson dominated by winning nine competitions; her first being on December 3, 2011 in Lillehammer. The 2012/13 season saw her win four World Cup competitions while finishing runner-up to nearest rival Sara Takanashi. Hendrickson was also able to win the women's event at the 2013 Ski Jumping World Championships in Val di Fiemme.

On August 21, 2013 in Oberstdorf, Hendrickson suffered a serious knee injury which required reconstructive surgery for a damaged ligament. She was one of five top female jumpers who, within a few months, had a bad fall and was forced to take a long recovery period. Hendrickson's injury would drain the chances of the United States women's team for a good result at the 2014 Winter Olympics in Sochi, but it was announced on January 22, 2014 that Hendrickson would still be able to make the team in time for the Games. She was granted the historic honor of being the first female to ever jump in a ski jumping event at the Olympics, with women having been allowed to participate in Olympic ski jumping for the first time in history.

Hendrickson re-injured her surgically repaired knee during off-season training in June 2015, ruling her out of the 2015/16 season.

In 2017, in an event sponsored by Red Bull, Hendrickson jumped off the historic Nansen Ski Jump in Berlin, New Hampshire. This event marked the first time the jump had been used in 32 years.

In December 2017, Hendrickson won the women's ski jumping competition at the U.S. Olympic Team Trials for Nordic Combined & Ski Jumping, securing her place on the U.S. Olympic team for Pyeongchang.

World Cup

Standings

Wins

References

External links 

Sarah Hendrickson profile at Women's Ski Jumping USA
Sarah Hendrickson profile at USSA

1994 births
American female ski jumpers
Living people
Olympic ski jumpers of the United States
Ski jumpers at the 2014 Winter Olympics
Ski jumpers at the 2018 Winter Olympics
Skiers from Salt Lake City
21st-century American women